Svetlana Kana Radević (Cyrillic: Светлана Кана Радевић; 21 November 1937  8 November 2000) was a Yugoslav architect, credited as the first female Montenegrin architect. Her work has been recognized by two national architecture prizes.

Biography
Svetlana Kana Radević was born on 21 November 1937 in Cetinje, Yugoslavia, where she attended elementary school and then completed high school at Slobodan Škerović School in Titograd (now Podgorica). She graduated from the Faculty of Architecture at the University of Belgrade and then went on to attain a master's degree from the University of Pennsylvania. She continued her studies in Japan, which strongly influenced her later work.

She was a full member of Doclean Academy of Sciences and Arts and the first vice president of Matica crnogorska, as well as a foreign member of the Russian Academy of Architecture and Construction Sciences. Her style was distinctive for the selection of materials she used, melding the structures with their external environment and the substantial size and power of her designs. Her most noted work was the Hotel Podgorica, for which she won the Federal Borba Award for Architecture in 1967. The building typifies her style in that it uses stone, a traditional building material, to play with unique shapes which jut out from the façade, in an nontraditional manner. At the same time, the building fits into the landscape as if its concrete mass were always part of the environment. Her Monument to the Fallen Soldiers of Lješanska nahija in Barutana also won a national competition in 1975.

Radević died on 8 November 2000.

Works

 Kruševac Business Centre  and bus station
 Hotel Podgorica
 Hotel Mojkovac
 Hotel Zlatibor, Užice (Serbia)
 Lexicographic Institute
 Monument to the Fallen Soldiers of Lješanska nahija, Barutana

References

External links
 The Socialist Architecture of Svetlana Kana Radević
 photographs of Hotel Podgorica
 Architectural Review, Svetlana Kana Radević (1937–2000)
 Zua.rs, First Lady of Montenegrin Architecture

1937 births
2000 deaths
20th-century Montenegrin architects
Montenegrin architects
University of Belgrade Faculty of Architecture alumni
Montenegrin women architects
Fulbright alumni